Mbeya University of Science and Technology (MUST) is a public university in Mbeya, southern Tanzania.

References

External links
 

Public universities in Tanzania
Universities in Mbeya
Educational institutions established in 2012
2012 establishments in Tanzania